Deanna Russo (born October 17, 1979) is an American actress. She is known for her starring roles on the 2008 NBC version of Knight Rider and the 2014 USA Network television series Satisfaction.

Career
In 2003, she made her television debut in an episode of Charmed, and later guest starred on CSI: Crime Scene Investigation, CSI: NY, How I Met Your Mother, and NCIS. In 2007, she had a recurring role as Dr. Logan Armstrong on the CBS soap opera, The Young and the Restless.

In 2007, Russo won Best Director for her short, Taste of Kream, in the New Orleans Film Festival.

Russo starred in the NBC television movie (and backdoor pilot) Knight Rider as Sarah Graiman, the daughter of KITT's creator, Dr. Charles Graiman, and the childhood love of KITT's driver, Michael Traceur. From 2008 to 2009 she starred on the short-lived followup Knight Rider television series. She later had recurring roles on Gossip Girl, Rescue Me, Burning Love,  and Being Human.

In 2014 she began starring in the USA Network drama series, Satisfaction. She also appeared in the twelfth season of Two and a Half Men. In 2016, Russo appeared in the comedy film Jimmy Vestvood: Amerikan Hero.

Life
Russo was born in New Jersey. She began her career as a local theatre actress, before acting on television and independent films. She briefly modeled for two years.

Russo is married to Michael Cassady and gave birth to their first child, a daughter, in June 2015.

Select filmography

References

External links

1979 births
American television actresses
American people of Italian descent
Living people
Actresses from New Jersey
American soap opera actresses
21st-century American actresses